Lutterworth is a market town and civil parish in the Harborough district of Leicestershire, England. The town is located in southern Leicestershire, close to the borders with Warwickshire and Northamptonshire.

At the 2021 UK census, the civil parish of Lutterworth had a population of 10,833. The built up area of Lutterworth, which also includes the adjacent village of Bitteswell had a population of 11,364.

History 
Lutterworth was originally an Anglo Saxon settlement, its name is probably derived from the Old English Hlutre Worth: Lutterworth was mentioned in the Domesday Book of 1086.

Lutterworth was granted its market charter in 1214 by King John and became a small but busy market town.

In the 14th century, the religious reformer John Wycliffe was rector in St Mary's Church, Lutterworth between 1374 and 1384, and it was here that he is traditionally believed to have produced the first translation of the Bible from Latin into English. The church was restored in the 19th century and a large tower replaced the original spire. The church still contains some 15th-century wall paintings.

The Irish statesman Robert le Poer was parish priest here c.1318.

Lutterworth Grammar School was founded in 1630, by 1676 the population of Lutterworth had reached 644.

In the days of the stagecoach, Lutterworth was an important stopping-place on the road from Leicester to Oxford and London, and many former coaching inns remain in the town. The town also contains a number of well preserved half-timbered buildings.

Frank Whittle, inventor of the jet engine, developed some of the world's first jet engines at the British Thomson-Houston works in Lutterworth, and in nearby Rugby, during the late 1930s and the 1940s, with his company Power Jets. A replica of his first jet aircraft the Gloster E.28/39 stands in the middle of a roundabout just south of the town as a memorial and a number of papers and documents relating to Whittle's development of the jet engine are displayed at the town's museum.

The M1 motorway was built just to the east of Lutterworth in 1964, and the M6 motorway was built a few miles to the south in 1971.

At the time of the first national census in 1801, Lutterworth had a population of 1,652, this had nearly doubled to 3,197 by 1901. By 2001 it had reached 8,294. Further population growth in the 21st century has brought the population up to nearly 10,000 by 2017.

Notable buildings

Cavalier Inn 
One of the established landmarks of the town is the 17th-century building on the corner of George Street and Leicester Road, previously a tavern called the Cavalier Inn. The Cavalier Inn was located just on the northern edge of the town centre of Lutterworth. Although the building has been modified over the years, it still retains its rustic charm with stone walls and low ceilings and beams.

Originally called the "Ram Inn" – that part of George Street was called Ram Lane – it changed its name in the early 1970s after a brewery 'make-over' which greatly improved the interior. 
It is said that the brewery did not like the name Ram Inn and prudishly renamed it 'the Cavalier' after claims that wounded royalist soldiers sheltered in Lutterworth following the Battle of Naseby in 1645.

In October 2010 the Cavalier Inn closed and was changed in status to a log-burning store, retailing log-burning fires and similar products and services.

Lutterworth Town Hall

The architect of Lutterworth Town Hall was Joseph Hansom, who also designed Birmingham Town Hall and took out the first patent of the horse-drawn hansom cab.

Shambles Inn 
Another of the landmarks of the town centre is the thatched roof & timber-framed building now known as the 'Shambles Inn'. This former abattoir and butcher's is the oldest timber-framed building in Lutterworth, dating back to the 16th century. It was first used as a public house from 1791 until 1840, when it was converted back to a home and butcher's shop. In 1982 it was converted back into a public house and named the Shambles.

In February 2023, the Shambles public house, caught fire. Causing damage to the upstairs, the B&B and the house.  A fundrasing page was set up for the family who lived at the public house.

Local economy 
To the west of the town [] is a large logistics and distribution centre called Magna Park, which is the main source of employment in the Lutterworth area. Magna Park is built upon the site of the old Bitteswell aerodrome. Also near Lutterworth is Stanford Hall.

A controversial issue in the town is how to manage the traffic flows emanating from Magna Park and the nearby M1 and A5 trunk roads. Approximately 3,000 heavy goods vehicles pass through the town every day and pollution levels are reported as being high.

The Census 2011 Summary also indicates an overall growth in residents' vehicles, which is likely to add to traffic and pollution concerns according to the Census summary.

There is a Morrisons Food Store (formerly Safeway) on Bitteswell Road, as well as a Subway on High Street. Waitrose opened on 11 March 2010 on a site previously occupied by Netto. Aldi opened a new store on Rugby Road on 12 Aug 2021.

On the Greenacres Housing estate in the town there was an estate public house, recently called 'The Sir Frank Whittle' and previously called 'The Balloon'. This building was sold by the brewery to the Co-op who changed the use and structure of the premises to be the new Co-op store in the town. The Co-op Food Store previously located on George Street closed in June 2014 coinciding with the opening of the new store.

Lutterworth also houses the headquarters of the free Bible distributors 'Good News for everyone'. This organisation, formerly known as British Gideons, has been headquartered in Lutterworth since 1974.

Transport 
Lutterworth lies on the A426 Leicester–Rugby road, adjacent to the M1 motorway at junction 20. It is also located within a few miles of the M6 motorway and A5 trunk road. A southern bypass, the A4303, was opened in 1999, providing a route for traffic from the M1 to the A5 to avoid Lutterworth town centre.

The nearest railway station to Lutterworth is Rugby railway station about six miles to the south. The town formerly had its own railway station on the former Great Central Main Line which opened in 1899, and closed in 1969.

Arriva Midlands and Centrebus are the main operators of bus services around Lutterworth with services into Leicester, Market Harborough, Rugby, Warwickshire and Hinckley.

Sport
The town supports two individual local football teams :  Lutterworth Athletic F.C. and Lutterworth Town A.F.C. who both play in the United Counties League
There is also a tennis club – Lutterworth Tennis Club – located just outside Lutterworth on Hall Lane. Banger Racing was once staged in the town on farmland adjacent to the Coventry Road on the A4303. Racing ceased in the late 1990s.

Education

Primary schools
There are two primary schools in Lutterworth: John Wycliffe Primary School and Sherrier Primary School. Sherrier was originally housed in a Victorian building on Churchgate before moving to a new location on Bitteswell Road in 1983. Sherrier featured on the BBC TV children's TV programme Blue Peter on 5 February 2008.

Secondary schools
The local secondary schools are Lutterworth High School (for ages 11–16) on Woodway Road and Lutterworth College (for ages 11–18) on Bitteswell Road, both of which achieve good results in applicable exams. A new Studio School called Sir Frank Whittle Studio School opened in 2015 (for ages 14–18) that offers purely vocational courses. In 2019 the Sir Frank Whittle Studio School closed due to a lack of students and minimal further interest.

Health services
Feilding Palmer Hospital, run by Leicestershire Partnership NHS Trust is situated in the town.  It has a ward which provides general rehabilitation and palliative and end of life care.  Under the Leicester, Leicestershire and Rutland Sustainability and transformation plan it is proposed to close.

Popular culture
Mark Corrigan of the British television series Peep Show describes a trip to Lutterworth by public transport as taking so long that it feels like going to Mordor, a reference to Tolkien's The Lord of the Rings trilogy.

The 1973 sitcom Me, myself and Nigel Wright was set in an ostrich farm near the town.

See also 
 Bitteswell

References

External links 
 Lutterworth Town Council

 
Towns in Leicestershire
Market towns in Leicestershire
Civil parishes in Harborough District